Robert Prince may refer to:
 Robert Prince (American football), American football coach
 Robert Prince (captain) (1919–2009), World War II officer
 Robert Prince (composer) (1929–2007), ballet and Broadway composer
 Bobby Prince (Robert Caskin Prince III), video game composer